The First Reformed Church is a historic Reformed church in the Jamaica neighborhood of the New York City borough of Queens.  The church was built in 1859.  The church has an early romanesque structure that was designed by Sidney J. Young and built by Anders Peterson. The First Reformed Church has been refurbished as part of the Jamaica Center for Arts & Learning.

The asymmetrical towers, round-arched openings, and corbel tables are examples of an architectural style known as Rundbogenstil.

The church was listed on the National Register of Historic Places in 1980, and a New York City Landmark in 1996.

See also
List of New York City Designated Landmarks in Queens
National Register of Historic Places listings in Queens County, New York

References

External links
 

19th-century Reformed Church in America church buildings
Churches completed in 1859
Churches in Queens, New York
Jamaica, Queens
New York City Designated Landmarks in Queens, New York
Properties of religious function on the National Register of Historic Places in Queens, New York
Romanesque Revival church buildings in New York City
Rundbogenstil churches